The 15th Standing Committee of the Central Commission for Discipline Inspection (CCDI) was elected at the 1st Plenary Session of the 15th CCDI and then endorsed by the 1st Plenary Session of the 15th Central Committee on 18 September 1997.

Members

References
General
The 15th CCDI Standing Committee composition was taken from this source:
  
Specific

Central Commission for Discipline Inspection
1997 establishments in China
2002 disestablishments in China